Beteni Gewog is a former gewog (village block) of Tsirang District, Bhutan.

References

Former gewogs of Bhutan
Tsirang District